Hạ is a Vietnamese surname. The name is transliterated as He (a transcription of 賀) or Xia (a transcription of 夏) in Chinese and Ha in Korean. 

Ha is the anglicized variation of the surname Hạ. It is also the anglicized variation of Hà.

Vietnamese-language surnames